The 2014 European Parliament election in Italy took place on 25 May 2014. Italy elected 73 MEPs out of 751 European Parliament seats.

The governing Democratic Party (PD) won the election with 40.8% of the vote and 31 seats, followed by the Five Star Movement (21.2% and 17 seats) and Forza Italia (16.8% and 13 seats). As a result, the PD was the second largest national party in the European Parliament by number of seats after the German CDU/CSU and the largest among the Progressive Alliance of Socialists and Democrats. The PD's score was also the best result for an Italian party in a nationwide election since the 1958 general election, when the Christian Democracy won 42.4% of the vote.

The other parties that have passed the national electoral threshold at 4% are Northern League (6.2% and 5 seats), New Centre-Right – Union of the Centre (4.4% and 3 seats) and The Other Europe (4.0% and 3 seats). The parties that haven't passed the electoral threshold and that haven't gained any seat are Brothers of Italy (3.7%), European Greens – Green Italia (0.9%), European Choice (0.7%), Italy of Values (0.7%) and I Change – Associative Movement Italians Abroad (0.2%).

The 4% threshold can be bypassed by parties representing linguistic minorities, provided they get more than 50,000 votes, in connection with a party gaining more than 4% of the vote. The South Tyrolean People's Party, representing the German-speaking minority of South Tyrol, won a seat thanks to its connection with the PD.

Electoral system

The party-list proportional representation was the traditional electoral system of the Italian Republic since its foundation in 1946, so it had been adopted to elect the Italian representatives to the European Parliament too. Two levels were used: a national level to divide seats between parties, and a constituency level to distribute them between candidates. Italian regions were united in 5 constituencies, each electing a group of deputies. At national level, seats were divided between party lists using the largest remainder method with Hare quota. All seats gained by each party were automatically distributed to their local open lists and their most voted candidates.

In the run-up to the 2009 election, the Italian Parliament introduced a national threshold of 4% in the electoral law for the European Parliament. However, the electoral law guarantees representation for linguistic minorities. The parties which represent minorities can be connected with the major parties for the purpose of elections, combining their votes. If the party of the linguistic minority gets more than 50,000 votes, it wins a seat.

Main parties and leaders

Outgoing MEPs
This is a list of Italian delegations sitting at the European Parliament before 25 May 2014.

Summary of parties 
In the following table the twelve parties/lists participating in the election are listed.

Top candidates
In the following table the top candidates of each party/list in the five constituencies are listed. In the case in which the party leader stands in all five of them as top candidate, also the second in the list is shown. The Five Star Movement's slates were compiled following the alphabetical order.

Opinion polling
Poll results are listed according to the date of publication of the survey. Detailed data are usually published in the official website of the Italian government. The publication of opinion polls during the last 15 days of the electoral campaign is forbidden by Italian law.

Results

References

Italy
European Parliament elections in Italy
2014 elections in Italy